Nepolokivtsi is an urban-type settlement in Chernivtsi Raion (district) of Chernivtsi Oblast (province) in western Ukraine. It hosts the administration of Nepolokivtsi settlement hromada, one of the hromadas of Ukraine. Current population:

History
An urban-type settlement since 1968. In 1969 the population was 2287 people.

In January 1989 the population was 2764 people.

In January 2013 the population was 2493 people.

Until 18 July 2020, Nepolokivtsi belonged to Kitsman Raion. The raion was abolished in July 2020 as part of the administrative reform of Ukraine, which reduced the number of raions of Chernivtsi Oblast to three. The area of Kitsman Raion was split between Chernivtsi Raion and Vyzhnytsia Raion, with Nepolokivtsi being transferred to Chernivtsi Raion.

References

Urban-type settlements in Chernivtsi Raion
Bukovina
Populated places on the Prut